Moriah Castillo Peters (born October 2, 1992) is an American contemporary Christian singer and songwriter born in Pomona, California and raised in Chino, California and Ontario, California. In 2012, Peters released the album entitled I Choose Jesus, her first full-length studio album.

Background 
Moriah Castillo Peters was born on October 2, 1992, in Pomona, California. Her father is Los Angeles Superior Court Judge Anthony Moreno Peters and her mother is Patricia Castillo Peters; she has an older sister named Bianca and younger brother named Anthony Ezra. Peters grew up in the California inland towns of Chino and Ontario.

Peters started writing songs at the age of 13 and played the guitar since she was young.  Peters "had dedicated herself to the leadership of God at the age of 14 and can still remember her heart's genuine prayer of, 'God, I just want to be used by you.'"

Peters attended Don Antonio Lugo High School in Chino, California, where she achieved a 4.1 Grade Point Average, which earned her a scholarship to Cal State-Fullerton.  She planned to use the scholarship for law school with the end goal of becoming an entertainment lawyer. However, she felt compelled by God to become a Christian singer. She was initially uncomfortable about her "froggy" voice, but after hearing Jaci Velasquez, she never felt that way about her voice again. McKay compared her voice to that of Natalie Grant and Nichole Nordeman.  Because her dad is a jazz bass player, her musical influences are varied and include Chaka Khan, Stevie Wonder and Steely Dan.

Peters auditioned for American Idol, but the judges—Simon Cowell, Randy Jackson, and Avril Lavigne—were harsh to her because of her wholesome image, telling her to experience life ("kiss a boy") before entering the music industry.  Peters had a 'no kissing' rule and believed in waiting for marriage to kiss anyone. Touched by the values she portrayed at the audition, a random stranger introduced Peters to Wendi Foy, who helped her make a three-song demo to market to record labels in Nashville. As a result, Peters joined Reunion Records on August 11, 2011.  On April 17, 2012, Peters released the album I Choose Jesus.

Peters was the singing voice of Vanna Banana on the VeggieTales movie Princess and the Popstar.

During the writing phase of the I Choose Jesus album project Peters wrote 50 songs. Her inspiration for the album came from a myriad of places "including her family, her own relationship with Christ and experiences she's walked through with other young girls while leading her high school Bible study."

Her second album, Brave, was released July 15, 2014. "You Carry Me" was the lead single from the album.

She appeared in her first film, Because of Gracia, that was released in 2017.

Personal life 
Peters is of Mexican-French heritage. Peters married Joel Smallbone, from the band for King & Country, on July 7, 2013. They now reside in Nashville, Tennessee together.

Tours 
Peters was on The Hurt & The Healer tour with MercyMe and fellow artist Chris August, where she was the opening act for the two. Peters also toured with Tenth Avenue North, Audrey Assad, and Rend Collective Experiment in 2012 and 2013, during the "Struggle Tour". In August 2014 she was on the Air1 Positive Hits Tour.

Discography

Albums

EPs

Singles

Featured performer

References

External links
 

1992 births
Living people
21st-century American singers
21st-century Christians
American performers of Christian music
Grand Canyon University alumni
People from Chino, California
Reunion Records artists
Singers from California
Songwriters from California
21st-century American women singers